B77 or B-77 may refer to:
 B77, a 1980s solid-state reel-to-reel audio tape recorder by Swiss manufacturer Studer 
 B77 nuclear bomb, a 1970s United States Air Force thermonuclear bomb
 B-77, a temporary initial designation of the 1959 US Air Force AGM-28 "Hound Dog" cruise missile
 Bundesstraße 77, a road in Germany
 HLA-B77, an HLA-B serotype
 Sicilian Defense, Dragon Variation, according to the Encyclopaedia of Chess Openings
 Tamworth, according to the list of postal districts in the United Kingdom